Dallas Township is a township in Harrison County, in the U.S. state of Missouri.

Dallas Township was established in 1845, taking its name from George M. Dallas, 11th Vice President of the United States.

References

Townships in Missouri
Townships in Harrison County, Missouri